Gravenhurst is a civil parish located in the Central Bedfordshire district of Bedfordshire, England.

The parish includes Lower Gravenhurst, Upper Gravenhurst, as well as the hamlet of Ion.

Features of Gravenhurst include St. Mary's Church, which was built during the 14th century.

History 
Gravenhurst was recorded in the Domesday Book as Crauenhest. The entry reads: Crauenhest: William from Hugh de Beauchamp. The parish was formed on 24 March 1888 from "Lower Gravenhurst" and "Upper Gravenhurst".

References

External links

 Gravenhurst history timeline

Civil parishes in Bedfordshire
Central Bedfordshire District